This is a list of Singaporean Twenty20 International cricketers.

In April 2018, the ICC decided to grant full Twenty20 International (T20I) status to all its members. Therefore, all Twenty20 matches played between Singapore and other ICC members after 1 January 2019 will have T20I status.

Singapore played their first match with T20I status on during the Asian Qualifying Finals for the 2019 ICC T20 World Cup Qualifier in July 2019.

This list comprises all members of the Singapore cricket team who have played at least one T20I match. It is initially arranged in the order in which each player won his first Twenty20 cap. Where more than one player won his first Twenty20 cap in the same match, those players are listed alphabetically by surname.

Key

List of players
Statistics are correct as of 23 December 2022.

Notes

References 

 
Singapore